US 708 is a hyper-velocity O class subdwarf in Ursa Major in the halo of the Milky Way Galaxy. One of the fastest-moving stars in the galaxy, the star was first surveyed in 1982.

Discovery 
US 708 was first discovered in 1982 by Peter Usher and colleagues of Pennsylvania State University as a faint blue object in the Milky Way halo. Sloan Digital Sky Survey measured the star again in 2005.

Research 
The star's high velocity was originally suspected to be caused by the massive black hole at the center of the galaxy. But now it is found out that the star must have crossed the galactic disk about 14 million years ago and thus it did not come from the center of the galaxy; hence the speed now possessed by the star may not be attributed to the black hole.
However, closer study suggested it had been one element of a pair of close binary stars.

Its companion had already entered its white dwarf stage when US 708 entered its red giant phase.  Their respective orbits changed as its companion took gas from the outer layers of US 708.  Then its companion acquired enough mass to go supernova, which triggered US 708 being flung away at its high velocity, not by the black hole at the center of our galaxy. The team behind the new observations suggests that it was orbiting a white dwarf roughly the mass of the Sun with an orbital period of less than 10 minutes.

Structure 
The star is a high speed rotating, dense helium star which is supposed to be formed by the interaction of a companion star nearby. These stars are composed of helium, which is the remnant of a massive star which had lost its envelope of hydrogen. Geier's team describe the star as the "fastest unbound star in the galaxy" and employed the Echellette Spectrograph and Imager attached to the 10 meter Keck II telescope in Hawaii. Its velocity exceeds the escape velocity of our galaxy.

References

O-type subdwarfs
White dwarfs
Ursa Major (constellation)
SDSS objects
Astronomical objects discovered in 1982
Hypervelocity stars